Highland is the name of two places in the U.S. state of New York:

 Highland, Sullivan County, New York, a town
 Highland, Ulster County, New York, an unincorporated hamlet

See also 
 Highlands, New York, a town in Orange County